Olanrewaju Ogunmefun, better known by his stage name Vector, is a Nigerian rapper and songwriter. He has released three studio albums, including State of Surprise and The Second Coming (2012). In anticipation of his second studio album, he released a mixtape titled Bar Racks. Lafíaji, his third studio album was released in December 2016. He also released a mixtape in October 2018, The Rap Dialogue, in an effort to keep the spirit of Nigerian hip-hop alive. In November 2019, his fourth studio album, Vibes Before Teslim: A Journey to Self-Discovery, was released.

He is the voice behind a Sprite commercial that aired on radio stations across Nigeria since 2009. He also had "the longest freestyle rap in Nigeria"

In November 2019, he signed a joint venture with Starstruck Management Inc and Create Music Group to release his 4th studio project Extended play titled "Vibes Before Teslim: A Journey To Self-Discovery"

Early life
Lanre was born in Lagos State, hails from Ogun State, the fourth of five children. He schooled in Nigeria attending Command children school, Ijebu Ode Grammar School, Government College Victoria Island & Saint Gregory's College Ikoyi Lagos. He started his journey into hip-hop in junior high in 1994. In St. Gregory's College, he was involved in various social activities in which he was made to perform from the stage. In 1999, he formed a duo called Badder Boiz, who wrote their own songs and in the same year went on to start performing at showcases as a trio.

They recorded their first demo in 1999 and attended talent showcases. Vector was going in the direction of an emcee. As a group of three, consisting of Vector, Krystal & Blaze, they were together until 2004 when Krystal left due to irreconcilable differences. He then attended the University of Lagos, graduating in 2008 with a bachelor's degree in philosophy.

Career
Vector released his first official single "Kilode" for the album State of Surprise in February 2010. He later released the video for this single in June 2010. His second official single was "Mary Jane" which was released in April of the same year. The album was released on 29 October 2010, executive produced by Eloka "Culture" Oligbo. It featured 2 Face Idibia, General Pype, Chuddy K, Ade Piper, Emmsong, Sista Soul and with productions from H-Code, Sam Klef, Da Piano, J-Smith, Xela Xelz and Vibez Production.

He released a video for the song "Get Down" featuring 2Face Idibia in June 2011. At the Nigerian Music Video Awards 2011, he was nominated for "Best Mainstream Hip Hop Video". He was nominated at the 2010 Nigeria Entertainment Awards for "Best Collaboration With Vocals" with the track "Champion" in which he was featured in by General Pype.

His singles "Angeli" ft. 9ice and "Mr. Vector" featuring Jazzy, both produced by Sagzy were released on 19 May 2011 and were on heavy rotation on radio stations around the country. The video for "Angeli" was released in October 2011. In 2020, him alongside Bigtril, released a song called "og" that featured Raezy and Larry Gaaga. He has another collaboration with pallaso, called bubble remix.

Vector released the track "Born Leader" featuring Mavado of DJ Khaled's We the Best Music Group. "Born Leader" is Vector's third single off his second album titled The Second Coming. He shot the video in Miami, Florida and it was directed by Antwan Smith. In August 2013 he was featured by Pheelz a producer on a song titled "Popular" which gained airplay in radio stations across Nigeria.

In January 2015 Vector released a rap single titled "King Kong" and the video was released the same month. Vector released two remixes with the first one featuring Phyno, Reminisce, Classiq and Uzi, and the second remix featuring Ghanaian rapper Sarkodie which was released in May and June 2015 respectively. The video for the first remix was released in July 2015. On 15 July he released a fresh single titled "Kanawan Dabo" and on 24 July he released a freestyle titled "8". In May 2020, he signed a record deal with Def Jam Africa, a flagship of Def Jam Recordings in Nigeria. In December 2022 Vector was featured in Africa Cypher (Hennessy Cypher) that happened in Nigeria, the Cypher also featured artists such as A-Reece, M.i Abaga, M.anifest and Octopizzo.

Controversy
Nigerian artiste Reminisce recorded a diss track "ATA (Street Kitchen Reply)" with the line, "V-E what shit ki lo’n je be. Shebi iwo lo rap ju shit o ma pe’n nbe" in reply to Vector's verse on Sauce Kid's "KitcheStreet" in which Vector said "For all those boys wey dey show. Ti e ba fe ma form pe eyin lata ani tomato to ma to".

After this incidence Vector has replied with the track "Distractions (Reminisce Diss)", which he featured on with renowned lyricist A-Q. Vector hit him with the lines, "Cos you bleach your skin doesn't mean you are enlightened, Pig. I'm the base and my crew be strong, you cannot be the best cause you had one stupid song" and "And I'm made oh, and it's so public. But you, your life is like your videos, low budget." He is presently in a rap supremacy battle with Jude "M.I" Abaga, and has released diss tracks such as "The Purge" (featuring Vader and Paper) and also #JudasTheRat which was a response to M.I's #ThaViper.

In 2020, Vector and Jude "M.I" Abaga seem to have squashed their battle when they both met in the third and final part of "The Conversation", a Hennessy Nigeria documentary series based on the rivalry between M.I and Vector, the duo met face-to-face and discussed what transpired between them. Both rappers addressed what caused the beef and their thoughts on each other. M.I said he had the impression that Vector just doesn't like him, while Vector said he believes M.I is cunning and deceptive.

When asked by the interview if there is the possibility of a collaboration, Vector replied: "If this energy is pure, then there is no way I don't see a collaboration happening"

He however said in February 2021 that his beef with M.I sold them records. He said  "Did we make money with the beef tracks? Yes, the records sold. Yes, there comes a special demand for beef tracks by the fans. Our songs were streamed a lot; I mean, we trended at number one in the Genius.com, a lyrics website, which means Nigerians can go on and write something for the world to read and enjoy".

Discography

Studio albums
State of Surprise (2010)
The Second Coming (2012)
Lafíaji (2016)
Teslim: The Energy Still Lives in Me (2022)

Mixtapes
Bar-Racks The Mixtape (2012)
A7 (2014)

Extended plays 

The Rap Dialogue (2018)
Vibes Before Teslim: A Journey To Self-Discovery (2019)
The African Mind (2020)

Collaborative albums 

 Crossroads EP ( With Masterkraft ) (2020)

Filmography

Film

TV and Series

Singles

Albums and EPs

Awards and nominations

See also
List of Nigerian rappers

References

External links

Vector on Instagram
Official Website

Nigerian songwriters
1984 births
Yoruba musicians
Nigerian hip hop singers
Nigerian male rappers
Musicians from Ogun State
Living people
21st-century Nigerian musicians
The Headies winners
University of Lagos alumni
Ijebu Ode Grammar School alumni
21st-century male musicians